The Belleville funicular tramway was a cable car which from 1891 to 1924 connected the Place de la République in Paris to the Église Saint-Jean-Baptiste de Belleville, on a hill in the Belleville quarter. It has since been demolished.

It was a hybrid of a tramway and a funicular, similar to the famous San Francisco cable car system (started 1873), it was replaced in 1935 by Paris Métro Line 11, running on the same route.

History 
In the late 1880s, the need to serve the busy quarter of Belleville led to consideration of setting up a cable car line, uniquely able to manage the hill's inclination. But unlike San Francisco and other American cities where this new system was operating, which had wide roads on grid plans, the width of the Paris roads required a single track railway with plenty of passing loops along its rather meandering route.

In 1886, one Mr. Fournier submitted a request for a concession.

The funicular tramway became operational on 25 August 1891. The line started at the Place de la Republique, going up the Rue du Faubourg-du-Temple and the Rue de Belleville to its terminus in front of the Église Saint-Jean-Baptiste de Belleville. Its gradient was fairly steep, starting with a shallow slope but climbing the hill with gradients of at least 3.4% (1:30) but as high as 7% (1:14), with several tight curves.

The line quickly became popular: in 1895, it transported  million passengers. The line quickly reached capacity, and because it was impossible to add more passing loops, the line was operated in "bursts", with several vehicles closely following each other very closely. But this operation was particularly dangerous for pedestrians and road traffic. So it was decided to operate two cars together as a train, and their end platforms were extended over the couplings, increasing each car's capacity to 57 passengers. 1902 became the record year for the line, with  million passengers.

During the First World War the line was underfunded, and at its close needed heavy repairs to continue service. But operations finally ceased on 18 July 1924, and the tramway was replaced by a bus line called the "BF", operated by Schneider H buses with their front seats removed to increase capacity. This route was subsequently incorporated into the network of the Société des transports en commun de la région parisienne (STCRP). The infrastructure of the funicular tramway was demolished, the cars were sold for scrap, and for many months were held somewhere in Issy-les-Moulineaux. In 1935, Paris Métro Line 11 opened on the same route, extended at each end.

Technical characteristics 

The cable was of hemp rope reinforced by six steel strands.

Each terminus on the line was equipped with a pulley of  diameter, mounted horizontally under the pavement, which drove the endless traction cable. The cable passed over another tension wheel, which compensated for cable stretch.

The system was driven by two  Corliss steam engines, installed in the depot at 97 Rue de Belleville.

The rolling stock was never upgraded; the cars remained gaslit (with acetylene) and were unheated because of the short journey time.

The vehicles were equipped with a "grip" system, detachable pincers which took hold of the cable in the underground channel. To put the vehicle in motion, the driver progressively tightened the grip. This action, repeated several thousand times, limited the cable's lifetime to less than six months. To stop the car, the driver used a handbrake which acted on the wheels. Brake pads also acted against the rails.

The infrastructure was built by the Ville de Paris, directed by its chief engineer Fulgence Bienvenüe, better known as the architect of the Paris Métro.

Operation 

The funicular tramway served a populous quarter of Paris. Because of this, the flat rate fare was quite low, 10 centimes, and there were half-rate worker's fares at the start and end of the day. Despite the low fares, its popularity made the company extremely profitable.

Tramway operations barely changed throughout the line's existence: a departure every 11 minutes from 5am to 6am, then every 6 minutes from 6am until 12.30am. The total number of daily departures was as high as 364 in winter, and 382 in summer, with respectively 37 and 30 in the morning at half rate.

Accidents
Operational accidents were relatively rare, and mostly related to cable wear. If the cable broke it would wind around the grip, preventing the cars from stopping and causing them to overturn or run into those that had managed to disengage the grip in time. This could cause havoc in the streets.

But the steep slope of the Rue de Belleville caused the more spectacular accidents. The greatest was on 6 January 1906, when a ruptured grip resulted in a runaway car. The passengers panicked and ran, causing 17 injuries. In 1907 and 1909, brake failures caused two collisions between the tramcars and Mekarski system cars at the Rue des Pyrénées crossroads.

In popular fiction 
In , Pierre Souvestre and Marcel Allain describe Fantômas taking the funicular on return from a meeting with the Apaches.

See also 
 Tram
 Funicular
 Paris Métro Line 11
 Belleville (commune)

References

Sources

External links 

   La complainte du funiculaire, Song lyrics from the early 20th century
   Ménilmontant-Belleville: Mémoires d'un vieux quartier, television documentary aired on ORTF on 7 June 1965 (INA website)

Funicular railways in France
Tram transport in France
Metre gauge railways in France
Railway lines opened in 1891
Railway lines closed in 1924